Live at Monterey is an album that contains the performance by the Jimi Hendrix Experience recorded at the Monterey Pop Festival on June 18, 1967. Released on October 16, 2007, it is the third Hendrix album of recordings from Monterey, following Historic Performances Recorded at the Monterey International Pop Festival (1970) and Jimi Plays Monterey (1986).

Track listing

See also
 Historic Performances Recorded at the Monterey International Pop Festival
 Jimi Plays Monterey

References

Live albums published posthumously
Jimi Hendrix live albums
2007 live albums
Albums produced by Eddie Kramer
Universal Records live albums